Wang Shaudi is a Taiwanese director, writer and film producer who has been involved in making such production as Life Plan A and B, 1000 Walls in Dream and Tropical Fish. She has won multiple awards for her work including one for Best Screenplay at the Golden Horse Film Festival and one for Best Film at the Taipei Film Festival. In 2014 she was presented with the Taiwan National Award for Arts for her contributions to film making.

Biography
Wang was born in Taipei in 1953 and studied at the National Taiwan University of Arts before pursuing a master's degree in theatre at Trinity University in Texas. In 1979 she returned to Taiwan and later co-founded production company Rice Film International with fellow director Huang Li-Ming in 1992. After working on a number of television projects she writ and directed her first feature film Accidental Legend which was released in 1996. Two years later she directed the animation Grandma and Her Ghosts which went on to win awards at the Taipei Film Festival, the Hong Kong International Film Festival and the Vancouver International Film Festival.

Selected filmography

Director

References

External links
 

Chinese women film directors
1953 births
Film directors from Taipei
Taiwanese film producers
Chinese women screenwriters
Living people
LGBT film directors